John Mikael Holtz Elvesjö (born September 19, 1977), is a Swedish entrepreneur and inventor.

Elvesjö studied Engineering Physics at the Royal Institute of Technology in Stockholm.   he was at Företagsekonomiska Institutet, for a Course in professional Board Work and Legal education for board members.

He left Tobii as a Chief Technical Officer and former deputy Chief Executive Officer, co-founder at Tobii technology.  He is now at Brightly Ventures as a Managing Partner.

Biography 
Born Holtz, John Elvesjö took his mother’s maiden name at the age of 18 when his father died.

He founded his first company in 1999, Jenser Technology, which was a spin-off from the Institute of Surface Chemistry and based on his previous research there. In 1995, Elvesjö was recruited by Henrik Eskilsson as the first employee of Trampolinspecialisten. Elvesjö, Henrik Eskilsson and Marten Skogö founded a new company in 2001 which was named after John’s nephew Tobias Elvesjö who, at the age of 2 years old, struggled to pronounce his nickname Tobbe, and instead said Tobii.

Elvesjö is currently a Managing Partner at Brightly Ventures.

The eye-tracking was developed by inventors Elvesjö and Mårten Skogö. Eye-tracking is a tool or instrument that served as a mouth, touchedscreen or pad of a computer system. It is like an eye glass of a human beings that carries the functions of a mouth, pad and touched screen.

Brightly Ventures AB 
In 2018, Elvesjö took up office as a Managing Partner of Brightly Ventures AB. He 

Founded Brightly Ventures together with three co-founders, an early-stage Nordic venture firm based in Stockholm, investinin e technology teams and companie . The fund, raised in 2018, of 551MSEK closed for new investments in Sept. 2021.

Tobii AB (Publ.) 
From 2001 –  2018  Elvesjö was a Co-CEO and Chief Technology Officer of Tobi AB (Publ.). He Founded the company, together with two co-founders, based on his own research work from 1999-2001. Built a +1000 employee (350 R&D staff) high tech company including responsibility for investor relations and M&A, raising ~200MUSD in venture capital and leading the acquisition of eight companies. Co-CEO during all years. Group CTO and R&D-manager from founding until end of 2015. Representing the founders as Director on the Board from founding until June 2019.

Jenser Technology AB 
Elvesjö was the CEO of Jenser Technology AB from 1999-2003. He Founded Jenser Technology as a spin-off from the Institute of Surface Chemistry based on own research. In the year 2001 the company got an award in the Environmental Innovation Competition. The company was acquired by KSV NIMA / Biolin Sientific in 2003.

Institute for Surface Chemistry (YKI) 
Elvesjö  was a Researcher and Project Manager at Institute for Surface Chemistry (YKI)  From 1998 – 2000. He contributed significantly with mathematics and innovation to the development of several measuring instruments and sensors including the sensors further developed and commercialized by Jenser Technology and Tobii.

Scholarships, grants and publications

 John, Elvesjö (September, 03, 2012) "Technology with a Vision" World Economic Forum

 John, Elvesjö (April 21, 2015) Changing the World in the Blink of an Eye
 System and methods for controlling automatic scrolling of information on a display or screen
 1998 - 2018 Authored and co-authored 40 or more patents/applications and scientific publications
 2000 Stockholms Stads Uppfinnarstipendium – First prize
 2001 MiljöInnovationsPriset – First Prize with Mårten Skogö for a method of optimizing detergent dosage by measuring surface tension
 2002 SKAPA Stipendiet – Grant of SEK 25,000

Selected publications 
 Skogö M, et. al. Power efficient image sensing apparatus, method of operating the same and eye/gaze tracking system. CA2848641A1 Elvesjö J. Intelligent user mode selection in an eye-tracking system. US20140313129A1  Skogö M, et. al. Gaze-controlled user interface with multimodal input. US20140354539A1  Elvesjö J. Computer graphics presentation systems and methods. US20140320531A1  Elvesjö J, et. al. Method and installation for detecting and following an eye and the gaze direction thereof. WO2004045399A1  Skogö M, et. al. Method and instrument for measuring surface tension. US7266995B2

Awards and honors 
 2015,  Finalists for the European inventor. Awards
 2005 Entrepreneur of the Year Award (ALMI)
 2007 Ranked number three of "up comers 2007" (Sweden's men and women under 40 most likely to influence the future) by Shortcut magazine
 2008 Honored as "IT-Renewer of the Year" by Chef magazine and Teliasonera 
 2015 awarded Polhemspriset by Sveriges Ingenjörer 
 Awards given to businesses based on John’s innovations include “Swedish Electronics Company of the Year”, Deloitte “Fastest Growing Technology Company in Sweden” and “Fast 50 award” several years, Microsoft “Ingenuity Point” Winner, “World Class Company” and “Export Hermes” appointment by the Stockholm Chamber of Commerce, “Swedish IT Company of the Year”, the “Golden Mouse” award by Affärsvärlden and Computer Sweden and first prize in the “Environmental Innovation Competition”.

Membership 

 2022 Member of the Board of Directors at Swedish Space Corporation
 2018 Board of directors and Managing Partner at Brightly Ventures
 2018 Board member of directors of Tobii 
 2011 Board member at consumer electronics form Mutewatch 
 2011 Board member at cloud computing firm Xcerion 
 2010-13 Advisory board member at Stockholm Innovation and Growth
 2019 Board member at Yabie
 2019 Board member at Wehype 
 2016 –  2021 Board member at Vinnova 
 2015 –2018 Board Member / Advisor at Resolution Games 
 2016 – 2018 Board member at Moor Capita

References

Sources
 Tomas Zirn, "Idén föddes en kväll på labbet," Computer Sweden October 27, 2009 
 Tomas Zirn, "John Elvesjö - med näsa för affärer," Computer Sweden October 27, 2009 
 Klas Andersson, "De gör datorn till en ögontjänare," Svenska Dagbladet July 22, 2008

External links
 Tobii Technology official website
 Trampolinspecialisten official website 
 YKI official website YKI
 Awards received by Tobii
 SKAPA Stipendiet
 Stockholm Business Region

Swedish businesspeople
KTH Royal Institute of Technology alumni
1977 births
Living people